Moses Lake Municipal Airport  is a public use airport located within the city of Moses Lake. The airport property was deeded to the city in 1947 by the Northern Pacific Railroad. Since 1994, operations at the Municipal Airport have been overseen by the Airport Commission. In February 2021, the wording of closure conditions for the airport was changed by the city to promote development.

References

Airports in Washington (state)
Transportation buildings and structures in Grant County, Washington